The women's 4 × 400 metres relay at the 2014 IAAF World Relays was held at the Thomas Robinson Stadium on 24 and 25 May.

Records
Prior to the competition, the records were as follows:

Schedule

Results

Heats

Qualification: First 3 of each heat (Q) plus the 2 fastest times (q) advanced to the final.

Final

Final B

Final A

References

4 x 400 metres relay
4 × 400 metres relay
2014 in women's athletics